Bessho may refer to;

Places
Bessho, a mountain in Norway 
Bessho Station (Shiga), Japanese railway station 
Ueda Electric Railway Bessho Line, Japanese railway line 
Himeji-Bessho Station, Japanese railway station 
Bessho Station (Hyōgo), Japanese railway station

People
Bessho (surname)